Loxigilla is a genus of passerine birds in the tanager family Thraupidae. The two species are both endemic to the Lesser Antilles.

Taxonomy
The genus Loxigilla was introduced in 1831 by the French naturalist René Lesson. The type species was later designated as the Lesser Antillean bullfinch by George Robert Gray in 1855. The name is a combination of two genera introduced by Carl Linnaeus in 1758: Loxia for the crossbills and Fringilla for a group of finches. Although formerly placed with the buntings and New World sparrows in the family Emberizidae, molecular phylogenetic studies have shown that the genus is a member of the tanager family Thraupidae and belongs to the subfamily Coerebinae which also includes Darwin's finches.

The genus contains two species, both endemic to the Lesser Antilles:

The Greater Antillean bullfinch and Puerto Rican bullfinch were formerly placed in this genus, but are now placed in Melopyrrha.

References

 
Bird genera
 
Endemic birds of the Caribbean
Taxa named by René Lesson
Taxonomy articles created by Polbot